The Kip Keino Classic is a track and field meeting held at the Kasarani Stadium in Nairobi, Kenya and named after Olympian Kipchoge Keino. The inaugural edition took place in 2020 as part of the inaugural World Athletics Continental Tour.

The venue is at 1,612 metres in elevation, slightly over 1 mile in altitude, thus all marks set here are considered at altitude which is an advantage to short, explosive events like sprinting and jumping due to less air resistance but a dis-advantage to long distance runners due to the availability of less oxygen.

Meet records

Men

Women

References

External links
Official website

Recurring sporting events established in 2020